El-Lejjun may refer to one of two ancient Roman legionary stations in the Levant:

 Lajjun (Arabic: اللجّون, al-Lajjûn), later a Palestinian Arab village located 16 kilometers (9.9 mi) in Mandatory Palestine, northwest of Jenin and 1 kilometre (0.62 mi) south of the remains of the biblical city of Megiddo. 
 Betthorus, a fortress of the Legio IV Martia on the Limes Arabicus, later El-Lejjun, Karak Governorate, Jordan, north-east of Al Karak.